Ramsbottom Rides Again is a 1956 British western comedy film produced and directed by John Baxter. The film features radio, film and stage star Arthur Askey in the lead role of Bill Ramsbottom, with Sid James, Shani Wallis, Betty Marsden and Jerry Desmonde in supporting roles. Pop singer Frankie Vaughan, in his film debut, sings "This is the Night" and "Ride, Ride, Ride Again." Anthea Askey, Arthur's daughter has a minor role.

In his book, Great Hollywood Westerns, author John Howard Reid included Ramsbottom Rides Again.

Plot
Yorkshire pub owner Bill Ramsbottom (Arthur Askey) is finding the introduction of the "telly" has ruined his business at the "Bull & Cow". When he receives a cable from Canada, and learns that his grandfather "Wild Bill" Ramsbottom has left his estate to him, he confers with his family before deciding to set off for the frontier town of Lonesome in Canada to claim his inheritance.

When all the family fortune is gathered together, there is not enough money to pay for tickets on a steamship for everyone. Ramsbottom and his mate, Charlie Watson (Glen Melvyn), stow away in big steamer trunks but are discovered by the crew. Made to work their passage, Charlie and Ramsbottom end up as culinary servers on the voyage. When the captain realizes that "Wild Bill" Ramsbottom's grandson is aboard, he allows him to travel as a passenger.

Arriving at Lonesome, Ramsbottom learns that part of his bequeathment, is that he is the new proprietor of the saloon, which also comes with the job of deputy sheriff in the lawless town. The feared outlaw Black Jake (Sid James) also claims he owns the saloon, but more importantly, wants to locate a hidden map that points the way to a uranium mine on Indian territory.

Ramsbottom and Black Jake have a confrontation at the saloon where the outlaw is arrested, but is later set free. When the map turns up, Charlie and Ramsbottom head off into Indian lands to locate the uranium mine. They run into Indian chief Blue Eagle (Jerry Desmonde), and the local tribe.

When Black Jake rounds up his gang, a shootout takes place at the saloon. With the help of townspeople and the RCMP, Ramsbotttom is successful in defeating the outlaws and establishing peace in the town.

Cast

 Arthur Askey as Bill Ramsbottom
 Glenn Melvyn as Charlie Watson
 Betty Marsden as Florrie Ramsbottom
 Shani Wallis as Joan Ramsbottom
 Danny Ross as Danny 
 Anthea Askey as Susie
 Sidney James as Black Jake
 Frankie Vaughan as Elmer
 Jerry Desmonde as Blue Eagle
 Sabrina as Attractive Girl 
 Dennis Wyndham as Dan 
 Gary Wayne as Tombstone
 Billy Percy as Reuben

Production
Ramsbottom Rides Again was filmed in Beaconsfield Film Studios, Beaconsfield, Buckinghamshire, England. The animated opening scene shows a Yorkshire landscape of homes with television aerials popping up, setting up the initial conundrum for the Bull & Cow pub.

Critical reception
TV Guide gave Ramsbottom Rides Again one out of four stars, calling it "A barely funny British parody of the American western." Britmovie called it " laboured and overlong."

Sky Movies rated it three out of five stars, and wrote, "There are quite a few laughs in this broad English version of Destry Rides Again... Lots of good-natured, juvenile fun ... with Sidney James getting in some practice for his Rumpo Kid in Carry On Cowboy by playing Black Jake. Norman Wisdom's sidekick Jerry Desmonde is very funny as an Indian named Blue Eagle, and a starry cast also includes Shani Wallis and Frankie Vaughan."

References

Notes

Citations

Bibliography

 Larkin, Colin. The Virgin Encyclopedia of 50s Music. London: Virgin, 2002. .
 Reid, John Howard. Great Hollywood Westerns: Classic Pictures, Must-See Movies and 'B' Films. Raleigh, North Carolina: Lulu.com, 2006. .

External links
 

1956 films
Royal Canadian Mounted Police in fiction
Films set in Canada
1950s Western (genre) comedy films
British Western (genre) comedy films
1956 comedy films
1950s English-language films
1950s British films
British black-and-white films